Tadeusz Romuald Jeziorowski (born in 1944) is a Polish historian and writer specialising in weaponry, uniforms and orders.

A graduate of the Kraków High School of Fine Arts, he earned an MA in Connoisseurship Studies from the Faculty of the Fine Arts in Nicolaus Copernicus University in Toruń. Since 1968 he worked in the Military Museum of Wielkopolska (part of the National Museum, Poznań). He was its head since 1973, and also had the title of curator between 1991 and 2012.

He is a member of the team for addressing and providing opinions on matters related to orders and distinctions, heraldry and vexillology in the Presidential Office of the Republic of Poland and in the Heraldic Commission at the Ministry of the Interior and Administration.

He is also a part of the Association of Old Arms and Uniforms Amateurs (Stowarzyszenie Miłośników Dawnej Broni i Barwy), the Polish Heraldic Society (Polskie Towarzystwo Heraldyczne), German BDOS (Deutsche Gesellschaft für Ordenskunde e. V.); founder and honorary president of the Society of Former Soldiers and Friends of the 15th Regiment of Poznań Lancers (Towarzystwo b. Żołnierzy i Przyjaciół 15. Pułku Ułanów Poznańskich).

He was awarded Knight's and Officer's Cross of the Order of the Rebirth of Poland (2008 and 2017).

Author of the first Polish monograph of the pallasch sword: , Poznań 2001, of a text on uniforms  (with A. Jeziorkowski, illustrations) Warszawa 1992, and of a catalogue of the collection of the Military Museum of Wielkopolska  (with J. Łuczak) Poznań 1993, and of a monograph of the orders during napoleonic era  (with R. Morawski, illustrations) Warszawa 2018.

He has written numerous articles on the above topics, including one on the history of the Order of Saint Stanislaus Bishop and Martyr 1765–1795 in the catalogue , Warszawa 2016.

He has set up many thematic exhibitions, e.g., he acted as initiator and co-author of the show For the Homeland and the Nation. 300 Years of the Order of the White Eagle at the Warsaw Royal Castle in 2005.

Works 

  (Poznań, 1978)
  (Poznań, 1978)
  (Warszawa, 1992)
  (Poznań, 1995)
  (Poznań, 2001)
  (Poznań, 2003)
  (Poznań, 2003)
  (Warszawa, 2003)
  (Poznań, 2006, 2007, 2008)
  Warszawa, 2018)

References

1944 births
Museum people
Polish male writers
20th-century Polish historians
Polish male non-fiction writers
Knights of the Order of Polonia Restituta
Officers of the Order of Polonia Restituta
Recipients of the Medal of Merit for National Defence
Solidarity (Polish trade union) activists
Nicolaus Copernicus University in Toruń alumni
Living people
21st-century Polish historians